"A Certain Smile" is a popular song from the 1958 film of the same name. The song was written by Sammy Fain and Paul Francis Webster. Johnny Mathis performed the song in the film, and the song reached No. 4 on the UK chart.

The song was nominated for the 1958 Academy Award for Best Original Song.

Background
The music was written Sammy Fain with lyrics by Paul Francis Webster for the 1958 film of the same name, based on the novel, also titled A Certain Smile, by Françoise Sagan. Johnny Mathis, who appeared in the 1958 film as a bar singer, performing the title song. Mathis's recording, with backing orchestration by Ray Ellis and released in June 1958 (4-41193), backed with "Let It Rain". The song reached number 4 on the UK Singles Chart and number 14 on the US chart.

Charts

Other recorded versions
The song has been covered by artists such as: 
Astrud Gilberto recorded it for her 1966 album, A Certain Smile, a Certain Sadness.
Jay and the Americans released a version of the song on their 1963 album, At the Cafe Wha?

Popular culture
The song was featured in the 2010 BBC production of A Passionate Woman.

References

1958 songs
1958 singles
Songs written for films
Songs with lyrics by Paul Francis Webster
Songs with music by Sammy Fain
Johnny Mathis songs
Jay and the Americans songs
Columbia Records singles
Fontana Records singles